Edavilangu is a village in Kodungallur, in Thrissur district, Kerala, India, 5 km distance from its Taluk Main Town Kodungallur and 38 km distance from its District Main City Thrissur.
Edavilangu Pin Code is 680671. The west side of Edavilangu is the Arabian sea. Many devotees pass through this village at the time of Kodungallur bharani mahotsavam. GHS Edavilangu is the main educational institution in Edavilangu.

The Edavilangu screw pine mat market is specialization at its best. The market is solely for the mats and is held every day, between 2 P.M. until late into the evening.

References

Villages in Thrissur district